The 1965 Formula One season, which was the 19th season of FIA Formula One racing, featured the 16th World Championship of Drivers and the 8th International Cup for F1 Manufacturers. The two titles were contested concurrently over a ten-round series which commenced on 1 January and ended on 24 October. The season also included a number of non championship races for Formula One cars.

Season summary
Jim Clark's second championship included six wins interrupted only by non-starting at Monaco whilst he was away winning the Indianapolis 500. Jackie Stewart finished third in the championship in his debut season and Richie Ginther won his only, and Honda's first, Grand Prix in the final race of the 1.5-litre formula.

Season review

The Austrian Grand Prix at the Zeltweg Airfield, originally supposed to be run between the German and Italian Grands Prix, was cancelled after safety complaints made by the teams and drivers about the roughness of the track.

Teams and drivers
The following teams and drivers competed in the 1965 FIA World Championship.

World Drivers' Championship standings

Points towards the 1965 World Championship of Drivers were awarded on a 9–6–4–3–2–1 basis to the top six finishers at each round. Only the best six round results could be retained.

International Cup for F1 Manufacturers standings
Points were awarded on a 9–6–4–3–2–1 basis at each round with only the best six round results retained. Only the best placed car from each manufacturer at each round was eligible to score points.

Bold results counted to championship totals.

Non-championship races
Other Formula One races were also held in 1965, which did not count towards the World Championship. The last of them, the 1965 Rand Grand Prix, was the first Formula One race for cars with 3-litre engines.

Notes

References

External links
 1965 World Championship images at www.f1-photo.com
 1965 World Championship race results and images at www.f1-facts.com
 1965 FIA Formula One World Championship results at Formula1.com (archived)

Formula One seasons